Roger Bray may refer to:

J. Roger Bray (1929–2018), American-born ecologist
Roger Ernest Bray (1875–1952), Canadian activist